Jaquehuata (possibly from Aymara jaqhi cliff, wat'a island, "cliff island") is a mountain in the Vilcanota mountain range in the Andes of Peru, about  high. It is located in the Puno Region, Carabaya Province, Corani District. Jaquehuata lies east of the large glaciated area of Quelccaya (Quechua for "snow plain"). It is situated at the Anjasi valley and at an affluent of the Corani River northeast of Pata Anjasi and southeast of Cuncunani.

References

Mountains of Puno Region
Mountains of Peru